Cyrtodactylus zebraicus is a species of gecko that is found in Thailand. It was originally described as subspecies of Cyrtodactylus peguensis but appears to be more closely related to Cyrtodactylus oldhami instead.

References 

Cyrtodactylus
Reptiles of Thailand
Endemic fauna of Thailand
Reptiles described in 1962
Taxa named by Edward Harrison Taylor